Nater Guru is a Bengali movie released in 2003. Directed by Haranath Chakraborty, it featured Jeet, Koel Mallick, Ranjit Mallick and Moushmi Chatterjee. The film was Koel Mallick's cinematic debut. It was successful at the box office.

Plot
A romantic comedy based on Samaresh Basu's populer novel, Nater Guru revolves around four main leads, Robi, Shashi Bhushan, Sulochona and Manisha. Shashi and Sulochona are an estranged couple who are mutually separated from each other but not divorced legally. The separation is out of misunderstandings, egoism and preconceived notions from both sides. After 15 years, Sulochona is a business tycoon while Shashibushan is a worthless race course bookie. Their only daughter Manisha is a dancer, and resides with her mother. Sulochana suffers a heart attack and Manisha unable to get help turns to her father. The father-daughter combo decide that the ailing Sulochona can't be given any stress or anxiety. Hence they carry a stealth operation. They decide to hire Shashi's friend and ally Rabi (Jeet) Maitra and present him as Durgadas. Rabi is required by Manisha to give proxy whenever necessary. He becomes regular. But the two often quarrel and fight over irrelevant issues. Rabi gets insulted by the behaviour of Manisha. Rabi touches Sulochona's feet as Durgadasand brings forth his singing prowess. The music actually heals Sulochona and she is able to walk again. Sulochona loves Rabi. Meanwhile, Sulachona accidentally unravels Rabi's originality. Suluchona admires Rabi's honesty and self-esteem. Rabi's honesty and simplicity makes Manisha fall in love with him. Durgadas creates trouble. But with Shashi's cooperation the lovers reunite. Shashi and Sulochona rediscover their long lost love and the couple get reunited.

Cast
 Jeet as Rabi Maitra
 Koel Mallick as Manisha
 Ranjit Mallick as Manisha's Father
 Moushmi Chatterjee as Manisha's Mother
 Kanchan Mullick as Rabi's Friend
 Nimu Bhowmik
 Ashok Mukhopadhyay
 Pushpita Mukherjee as Mani
 Koushik Bhattacharya
 Sachin Mullick

Soundtrack

The album is composed by S. P. Venkatesh for Nater Guru. Singers are Jhantu, Swaran Lata, Monu, Pravakar, Anuradha Sriram.

References

External links

2003 films
2000s Bengali-language films
Bengali-language Indian films
Indian romantic comedy-drama films
2003 romantic comedy-drama films
Films based on works by Samaresh Basu
Films scored by S. P. Venkatesh
Films directed by Haranath Chakraborty